Luis Garrido (born 15 June 1952) is a Puerto Rican sports shooter. He competed in the mixed trap event at the 1988 Summer Olympics.

References

1952 births
Living people
Puerto Rican male sport shooters
Olympic shooters of Puerto Rico
Shooters at the 1988 Summer Olympics
Place of birth missing (living people)